László Orbán (2 August 1912 – 18 November 1978) was a Hungarian politician, who served as Minister of Culture between 1974 and 1976. He was a member of the National Assembly of Hungary between 1943 and 1953 and from 1958 until his death.

References
 Magyar Életrajzi Lexikon

1912 births
1978 deaths
People from Pest County
People from the Kingdom of Hungary
Social Democratic Party of Hungary politicians
Hungarian Communist Party politicians
Members of the Hungarian Working People's Party
Members of the Hungarian Socialist Workers' Party
Culture ministers of Hungary
Members of the National Assembly of Hungary (1947–1949)
Members of the National Assembly of Hungary (1949–1953)
Members of the National Assembly of Hungary (1953–1958)
Members of the National Assembly of Hungary (1958–1963)
Members of the National Assembly of Hungary (1963–1967)
Members of the National Assembly of Hungary (1967–1971)
Members of the National Assembly of Hungary (1971–1975)
Members of the National Assembly of Hungary (1975–1980)